Zhan (also Romanized as Zhān and Žān) is a village in Zhan Rural District, in the Central District of Dorud County, Lorestan Province, Iran. At the 2006 census, its population was 1,524, in 334 families.

References 

Towns and villages in Dorud County